Bolivians in Brazil are individuals of full, partial, or predominantly Bolivian ancestry, or a Bolivian-born person residing in Brazil. The governments of Bolivia and Brazil have begun to develop an agreement to regularize the situation of several thousand undocumented Bolivian immigrants in Brazil. According to estimates by the Ministry's of Latin American immigrants  and the National Association of Immigrants from Brazil more than 200,000 Bolivians are working illegally in São Paulo.

Nowadays, the Bolivians constitute the biggest group of foreigners living in the country, with an estimated 350,000 Bolivian nationals currently living in Brazil.

History 
Bolivians started coming to Brazil in small numbers during the 1950s, with current levels of immigration beginning in the 1980s. The numbers vary according to the source, but it is a fact that the information given by the media is very different from academic and official estimates.

Demographics 
About 40% of Bolivians go to the city of São Paulo, around 10% of Bolivians go to the city of Rio de Janeiro, and the border cities of Corumbá (Mato Grosso do Sul) and Guajará-Mirim (Rondônia) receive about 5% of the total each. Ethnographic reports have found that Bolivians in Corumbá are regularly subject to racial discrimination.

Notable Bolivian Brazilians

German Efromovich
Edivaldo Hermoza
Marcelo Moreno
Miguel Krigsner

References

Ethnic groups in Brazil
 
Brazil